Esther Jones (born April 7, 1969) is a former sprinter who won an Olympic gold medal in the 4 x 100 metres relay in 1992 Barcelona.

Jones was born in Chicago, Illinois, United States and ran track collegiately at Louisiana State University. She finished fourth in both the 100 m and 200 m at the 1988 World Junior Championships in Sudbury and won a bronze medal in the 4 x 100 m relay. She reached the semi-finals of the 200 metres at the 1991 World Championships in Tokyo. At the 1992 Barcelona Olympics, she won a gold medal in the sprint relay, running the second leg. Her teammates were Evelyn Ashford, Carlette Guidry and Gwen Torrence.

Jones' best legal times are 11.11 secs (July 1991) in the 100 metres, set in Rhede, and 22.47 secs (May 1992) in the 200 metres, set in San José. In the 100 m, she also ran a wind-aided 10.99 (+5.2) in Eugene (June 1991) and an 11.09 at altitude in El Paso (April 1994), with no wind gauge.

Her nephew, Trey McKinney-Jones, is a professional basketball player.

References

External links
 

American female sprinters
1969 births
Living people
Athletes (track and field) at the 1992 Summer Olympics
Olympic gold medalists for the United States in track and field
Track and field athletes from Chicago
LSU Lady Tigers track and field athletes
Medalists at the 1992 Summer Olympics
Universiade medalists in athletics (track and field)
Universiade gold medalists for the United States
Universiade bronze medalists for the United States
Medalists at the 1989 Summer Universiade
Olympic female sprinters
20th-century American women